The following is a list of sports venues in Australia.

National league stadiums
Venues for Australian rules football, cricket, rugby league, rugby union and soccer are listed here, if they are a regular venue of:
An Australian national team (Australia national cricket team, Australia national rugby league team, Australia national rugby union team, Australia national soccer team)
A club playing at an international level (Super Rugby)
A club playing at the highest domestic level of a major Australian sport (Australian Football League, AFL women's, National Rugby League, A-League, NRLW, W-League, domestic cricket, Big Bash League). Also included are venues of the Australian Baseball League.

An asterisk indicates that the tenant does not use the venue as their primary home venue.

Future national league stadiums and major redevelopments

Indoor venues
Venues for Basketball (men's and women's), Ice Hockey and Netball are listed here, if they are a regular venue of:
 An Australian national team (Australia national basketball team, Australia men's national ice hockey team, Australia national netball team)
 A club playing at the highest domestic level of the sport (National Basketball League (NBL), Women's National Basketball League (WNBL), Australian Ice Hockey League, Suncorp Super Netball)
 Retractable roof arenas included

An asterisk indicates that the tenant does not use the venue as their primary home venue.

See also
List of Australian Football League grounds
List of Australian cricket grounds
List of ice rinks in Australia
List of National Basketball League (Australia) venues
List of Australian rugby league stadiums
List of Australian rugby union stadiums
List of soccer stadiums in Australia
List of Oceanian stadiums by capacity

External links
 Austadiums.com - Australian Stadiums

Notes

 
 
Australia